Beddawi, Beddaoui, is a town situated at the Mediterranean Sea about 5 km north of Tripoli, Lebanon. It is a mainly Sunni Muslim Lebanese village.  It had 6,012 eligible voters in the 2009 election.  There are 4 primary schools and one secondary school and one soccer team.
The city is surrounded by orange orchards and has two monumental buildings of the crusades.
It has also a non-working petroleum refinery, out of order since the Lebanese civil war. Beddawi city should not be confused with the Beddawi Palestinian camp. 
Till today, Beddawi remains the main connection between the northernmost coast and the rest of Lebanon since the main coastal highway goes through the town. However, a couple of years ago, a separate highway closer to the coast started being constructed which should hopefully put less pressure and traffic on the little town.

History
Until the 1950s Beddawi was a little village surrounded by fields and had less than a 1,000 inhabitants.
In 1955 the Palestinian refugees built a camp near the city and named it Beddawi camp. In 1983 the city underwent several battles between the Palestinian Militias and parts of it were severely damaged.

References

External links
Beddaoui, Localiban 

Populated places in Miniyeh-Danniyeh District
Populated places in Lebanon
Sunni Muslim communities in Lebanon